The Oranje Nassau IV (located in Heerlerheide, Heerlen), the last and smallest mine exploited by the Oranje Nassau Mijnen, started its life as a ventilation shaft for Oranje Nassau III.  In 1910 the construction of a mine shaft was started.  However the construction was halted and only reassumed in 1919.  In 1927 the mine became operational.

Underground, the mine was connect to the Oranje Nassau III and, for safety reasons, also the Staatsmijn Hendrik.  In 1966 it became the first of the Oranje Nassau mines to close; however, via Oranje Nassau III mining activities continued till 1973.

In its short life it produced  of coal.

The terrain is now used by the Sigrano, a silversand mine, part of Sibelco.

External links
 http://citg.tudelft.nl/?id=18387 Coal Mining in the Netherlands (Delft University of Technology)

Coal mines in the Netherlands
Buildings and structures in Heerlen